Nocardiopsis algeriensis  is an alkalitolerant bacterium from the genus of Nocardiopsis which has been isolate from saharan soil from the Adrar Province in Algeria.

References

External links
Type strain of Nocardiopsis algeriensis at BacDive -  the Bacterial Diversity Metadatabase	

Actinomycetales
Bacteria described in 2015